Sadaung is a small town in eastern Myingyan District in the center of the Mandalay Region in Burma (Mandalay).  It is located just south of Route 2, south-west of Pyinzi and  eastsouth-east of Natogyi.

Notes

External links
 "Sadaung Map — Satellite Images of Sadaung" Maplandia

Populated places in Mandalay Region